Brooklyn Community Board 1 is a New York City community board that encompasses the Brooklyn neighborhoods of  Williamsburg and Greenpoint. It is delimited by the Newtown Creek and Queens Borough line on the east, Flushing and Kent Avenue on the south, and by the East River on the west.

Its current chairman is Dealice Fuller, and its district manager is Gerald A. Esposito.

As of the United States Census, 2000, the Community Board had a population of 160,338, up from 155,972 in 1990 and 142,942 in 1980. Of them (as of 2000), 77,040 (48.0%) were White non-Hispanic, 8,808 (5.5%) were African-American, 5,730 (3.57%) were Asian or Pacific Islander, 192 (0.1%) were American Indian or Native Alaskan, 3,635 (2.3%) were of some other race, 4,488 (2.8%) were of two or more races, and 60,445 (37.7%) were Hispanic.

46.7% of the population benefit from public assistance as of 2004, up from 32.9% in 2000.

References

External links
Official site of the Community Board

Community boards of Brooklyn
Williamsburg, Brooklyn
Greenpoint, Brooklyn